Homalocephala albitarsis is a species of ulidiid or picture-winged fly in the genus Homalocephala of the family Ulidiidae.

References

albitarsis
Insects described in 1838